Thomas Nugent may refer to:
Thomas Nugent, 1st Baron Nugent of Riverston (died 1715), Irish Roman Catholic barrister
Thomas Nugent, 4th Earl of Westmeath (1669–1752), Irish soldier and peer
Thomas Nugent (travel writer) (c. 1700–1772), Anglo-Irish gentleman travel writer
Thomas Nugent, 6th Earl of Westmeath (1714–1792), Irish peer and freemason
Tom Nugent (1913–2006), American football coach
Tom Nugent (physicist), American physicist
Tom Nugent (cricketer) (born 1994), English cricketer